Telesforo de la Cruz Trinidad (November 25, 1890 – May 8, 1968) was a Filipino fireman 2nd class in the United States Navy who received the Medal of Honor for actions in Mexican waters near La Paz, on board the USS San Diego on 21 January 1915. He is the second service member, and first and so far only sailor of Asian descent to receive the award in peacetime. Trinidad served during both World Wars before retiring to the Philippines and living on his pension.

On May 20, 2022, Navy Secretary Carlos del Toro announced that a future Arleigh Burke-class guided-missile destroyer will be named .

Medal of Honor citation

See also

List of Asian American Medal of Honor recipients
List of Medal of Honor recipients in non-combat incidents
Robert Webster Cary - Received Medal of Honor during the same incident

References

External links

1890 births
1968 deaths
People from Aklan
United States Navy Medal of Honor recipients
United States Navy sailors
United States Navy personnel of World War I
United States Navy personnel of World War II
Foreign-born Medal of Honor recipients
American military personnel of Filipino descent
Non-combat recipients of the Medal of Honor